Matador (meaning killer in Spanish) was a paint application targeted at the television and film production markets. Running on Silicon Graphics workstations, its main features were paint, mask creation/rotoscoping, animation, and image stabilization/tracking.

Matador was originally developed by Gareth Griffith, Chris Steele, Dominic Jackson and Andrew Ballingall of Parallax Software in the UK beginning in 1989. Adopted by production studios and visual effects houses such as ILM, Digital Domain, Sony Pictures and many others, Matador was used on hundreds of feature films throughout the 1990s and early 2000s, including Jurassic Park, Forrest Gump, and The Mask. In 1995 Parallax Software was acquired by Avid Technology, which continued to market Matador into the early 2000s, eventually incorporating its functionality into Softimage and Media Illusion.

Feature List

Paint: Resolution-independent 2D paint system supporting 64-bit color depth. Customizeable pressure-sensitive brushes, cloning, image filters, layers, vector shapes, color correction, 2D and 3D text, and macros.

Masking/Rotoscoping: Chromakey masking via luminance/chroma/component/hue, multi-layered rotoscoping with animatable rotosplines and automatic traveling mattes.

Animation: Keyframeable animation of all functions, hierarchical animation with unlimited layers and in-betweening, realtime linetest.

Stabilization/Tracking: Motion tracking using up to 256 reference points; image stabilization tools.

Release History

Credits

Feature films
1992: Death Becomes Her
1993: Jurassic Park, The Fugitive, Cliffhanger, In the Line of Fire, The Last Action Hero, Schindler's List
1994: Forrest Gump, The Mask, True Lies, Interview with the Vampire, Speed, Clear and Present Danger, The Crow, Star Trek Generations
1995: Babe, Apollo 13, Braveheart, Jumanji, Casper, Batman Forever, Waterworld, Tales from the Hood
1996: Independence Day, Twister, Dragonheart, Star Trek: First Contact, Mars Attacks!, Mission: Impossible
1997: Titanic, Men in Black, The Fifth Element, The Lost World: Jurassic Park, Contact, Starship Troopers, Batman & Robin, Dante's Peak, Flubber
1998: What Dreams May Come, Armageddon, Mighty Joe Young, The Avengers, Lost in Space, Saving Private Ryan
1999: The Matrix, Stuart Little, Star Wars Episode I: The Phantom Menace, The Mummy, Snow Falling on Cedars, Sleepy Hollow
2000: Gladiator, The Perfect Storm, Hollow Man, Cast Away, Crouching Tiger Hidden Dragon, X Men
2001: Lord of the Rings: The Fellowship of the Ring, Pearl Harbor, A.I. Artificial Intelligence, Amelie, Lara Croft: Tomb Raider
2002: Star Wars Episode II: Attack of the Clones, Men in Black 2, Minority Report, Spiderman, Harry Potter and the Chamber of Secrets
2003: Hulk

Television
Nestle Coffee Crisp advertisement
Carl's Jr. Dennis Rodman advertisement
Canadian Broadcasting Corporation (CBC) News
 Time Team, in which it is used extensively for virtual reconstructions of buildings and landscapes.

See also
Avid Elastic Reality
Avid Media Illusion
Avid Technology

References

IRIX software